Kunnilangadi is a small village situated in Ernakulam district, Kerala state, south India. It is situated about 19 km from Angamaly and 6 km from Kalady.

References 

Villages in Ernakulam district